Jamnagar District is a district of Gujarat in Western India. Its headquarters are located in the eponymous city of Jamnagar. It hosts the production facilities of large Indian companies such as Reliance. Among its attractions are several palaces, a Marine National Park and a Bird Sanctuary, known as Khijadiya Bird Sanctuary. In 2013, Devbhoomi Dwarka district was carved out of the western part of the district.

History 
Jamnagar was founded by Jam Rawalji Jadeja in 1540 A.D. as the capital of the Princely State of Nawanagar. Jamnagar, historically known as Nawanagar (the new town), was one of the most important princely states of the Jadeja’s in the region of Saurashtra. According to Pauranik literature, Lord Krishna established his kingdom at Dwarka town in Jamnagar district, after migrating from Mathura and accordingly, it is to the Yadava race that the Jams of Nawanagar trace their ancestry.

According to bardic chronicles, impressed by Jam Lakhaji’s role in at the siege of Pawagadh, Bahadurshah, the Emperor of Gujarat, bestowed 12 villages on him. As Jam Lakaji was going to take possession of his new fief, he was treacherously killed by his cousins, Tamachi Deda and Hamirji Jadeja. Jam Lakhajis son Jam Rawal escaped and on growing up, took vengeance of his father’s murder in the same manner by killing Hamirji Jadeja.

Hamirji’s two sons Khengarji and Sahibji fled to Delhi to pay obeisance to the mughal Emperor Humayun. During a lion hunt, the two brothers saved the Emperor from being killed by the lion. As a reward for their valour, an army was sent with them to regain their kingdom. When Jam Rawal heard of the two princes coming back to the Kutch with the imperial army, he started getting ready for the battle. On one night, he dreamt of the goddess Ashapura who told him that as he had broken an oath taken on her name about not killing Hamirji, even though, he was the person responsible for the death of his father. She had refrained from punishing him as he had at all other times honored her, but he was no longer to dwell in Kutch but cross the sea and reside in Kathiawar instead.

Jam Rawal and his entourage marched out of Kutch, attacked and killed King Tamachi the other conspirator in the killing of his father, and conquered the town of Dhrol and its dependencies. Jam Rawal bestowed the rule of Dhrol province to his brother Hardholji, who was later killed in battle, and the throne passed to his eldest son, Jasoji. Jam Rawal conquered parts of Saurashtra and formed his kingdom.

Once on a hunting trip on the land of present day Jamnagar, a hare was found to be brave enough to turn on the hunting dogs and putting them to flight. Deeply impressed by this, Jam Rawal thought that if this land can breed such hares, the men born here would be superior than other men, and accordingly made this place his capital. On the 7th day of the bright half of the month of Srawan, VS 1596 (August 1540 AD) on the banks of two rivers Rangmati and Nagmati, he lay the foundation of his new capital and named it Nawanagar (new town). Nawanagar eventually came to be known as Jamnagar meaning the town of the Jams.

Talukas (administrative divisions)
 Jam Jodhpur
 Jodiya
 Dhrol
 Jamnagar
Jamnagar Rural
 Lalpur
 Kalavad Taluka

Demographics

According to the 2011 census Jamnagar district has a population of 2,160,119, roughly equal to the nation of Namibia or the US state of New Mexico. This gives it a district population ranking of 212th in India (out of a total of 640). Its population growth rate over the decade 2001-2011 was 13.38%. Jamnagar has a sex ratio of 938 females for every 1000 males. It had literacy rate of 66.4% in 2001 which rose impressively in a decade to literacy rate of 74.4% by 2011.

The divided district had a population of 1,407,635, of which 729,270 (51.82%) lived in urban areas. The residual district had a sex ratio of 935 females per 1000 males. Scheduled Castes and Scheduled Tribes made up 122,958 (8.74%) and 14,500 (1.03%) of the population respectively.

In the residual distrct, Hindus were 1,173,452 (83.36), Muslims were 207,911 (14.77) and Jains 18,104 (1.29%).

Language

At the time of the 2011 census, 90.66% of the population spoke Gujarati, 3.96% Kachchhi and 2.56% Hindi as their first language.

Politics
  

|}

See also
Halar
Jamnagar

References

External links

 Official website
Jamnagar.org
halar.org
aapdujamnagar.com
historyofjamnagar.in

 
Districts of Gujarat